The Siboga worm eel (Muraenichthys sibogae) is an eel in the family Ophichthidae (worm/snake eels). It was described by Max Carl Wilhelm Weber and Lieven Ferdinand de Beaufort in 1916. It is a marine, tropical eel which is known from reefs in Timor and Samoa, in the Pacific Ocean.

References

Fish described in 1916
Muraneichthys